OYL or Oyl may refer to:

OYL
OYL may refer to:

 OYL Industries, a former air conditioner manufacturer
 Ontario Young Liberals

Oyl
Oyl is the surname of:

 Olive Oyl, cartoon character
 Castor Oyl, brother of Olive

See also

 Oil (disambiguation)